The 2018–19 PSA World Tour is the international squash tour organised circuit organized by the Professional Squash Association (PSA) for the 2018 squash season. It's the 4th PSA season since the merger of PSA and WSA associations in 2015.

The most important tournaments in the series are the Men's and Women's PSA World Championship. The tour also features two circuits of regular events - PSA World Tour (formerly PSA World Series), which feature the highest prize money and the best fields; and PSA Challenger Tour with prize money ranging $5,500–$30,000. In the middle of the year, the PSA World Tour tour is concluded by the Men's and Women's PSA World Tour Finals in Cairo, the season-ending championships for the top 8 rated players from World Tour level tournaments.

Overview

PSA World Tour changes
Starting in August 2018, PSA revamped its professional tour structure in two individual circuits; PSA World Tour and PSA Challenger Tour. 

PSA World Tour (formerly PSA World Series) will comprise most important tournaments in prize money ($50,000–$1,000,000) for more experienced and higher-ranked players, including PSA World Championships and PSA World Tour Finals, labelled as following:
PSA World Tour Platinum — 48-player draws — $169,000
PSA World Tour Gold — 24-player draws — $120,500
PSA World Tour Silver — 24-player draws — $88,000
PSA World Tour Bronze — 24-player draws — $51,250

PSA Challenger Tour tournaments will offer a $5,500–$30,000 prize-money, ideal circuit for less-experienced and upcoming players, that will include the following tiers:
PSA Challenger Tour 30 — $28,000
PSA Challenger Tour 20 — $18,000
PSA Challenger Tour 10 — $11,000
PSA Challenger Tour 5 — $5,500

Further, PSA will implement some rule changes like the removing of qualification rounds among others. Also PSA will grant 7 World Championship wildcards for winners of selected PSA Challenger Tour chosen by PSA. Additionally, PSA and WSF will jointly manage PSA Satellite Tour, a circuit for amateur or junior players who aim to become professionals.

Prize money/ranking points breakdown
PSA World Tour events also have a separate World Tour ranking. Points for this are calculated on a cumulative basis after each World Tour event. The top eight players at the end of the calendar year are then eligible to play in the PSA World Tour Finals.

Ranking points vary according to tournament tier being awarded as follows:

Calendar

Key

August

(QE): 2019 PSA World Squash Championships Qualifying Event.

September

(QE): 2019 PSA World Squash Championships Qualifying Event.

October

November

(QE): 2019 PSA World Squash Championships Qualifying Event.

December

January

February

(QE): 2019 PSA World Squash Championships Qualifying Event.

‡: Not a PSA World Tour tournament.

March

April

May

June

July

Statistical information

The players/nations are sorted by:
 Total number of titles;
 Cumulated importance of those titles;
 Alphabetical order (by family names for players).

Key

Titles won by player (men's)

Titles won by nation (men's)

Titles won by player (women's)

Titles won by nation (women's)

World Championship qualifiers
Winners of a select group of PSA Challenger Tour tournaments chosen by PSA receive a wildcard for the 2019 PSA World Championship. The qualified players were:

National championships
These are the winners of the most relevant  national squash championships.

Retirements
Following is a list of notable players (winners of a main tour title, and/or part of the PSA Men's World Rankings and Women's World Rankings top 30 for at least one month) who announced their retirement from professional squash, became inactive, or were permanently banned from playing, during the 2018-19 season:

 Omneya Abdel Kawy (born 15 August 1985 in Giza, Egypt) joined the pro tour in 1999, reaching the singles no. 4 spot in October 2010. Reached 32 finals winning 8 WISPA/WSA/PSA titles. 2010 World Championship runner-up losing to Nicol David in the final. Played 474 matches in the professional tour winning 286 (60.33% winning pct). She retired in November 2018 after 19 years on the tour.
 Nafiizwan Adnan (born 24 April 1986 in Terenggenau, Malaysia) turned professional in 2004 and reached a career-high world ranking of no. 26 in May 2017. He reached 24 PSA Tour finals out of 200 total PSA tournaments, winning 11 PSA titles, the last of which came at the Manitoba Open in March 2018. He won 262 matches from a total of 450 at a win rate of 58.2%. In 2018, he won a bronze medal at the 2018 Commonwealth Games on Australia's Gold Coast, beating Nick Matthew in the quarter finals and Joel Makin in the bronze medal match. He retired in May 2019 after losing to Saurav Ghosal at the quarter final stage of the Asian Individual Squash Championships.
 Mohammed Reda (born April 16, 1989 in Cairo, Egypt) turned professional in 2005 and reached a career-high world ranking of no. 23 in October 2011. He reached 23 PSA Tour finals out of 178 total PSA tournaments, winning 15 PSA.

See also
2018–19 PSA World Tour Finals
2019 Men's PSA World Tour Finals
2019 Women's PSA World Tour Finals

References

External links
 PSA World Tour

PSA World Tour seasons
2018 in squash
2019 in squash